Walter Giffard (c.1225–1279), was the Chancellor of England and archbishop of York.

Walter Giffard may also refer to:
Walter Giffard, Lord of Longueville (died 1084), Norman baron and Christian knight
Walter Giffard, 1st Earl of Buckingham (died 1102), Anglo-Norman magnate, son of the previous
Walter Giffard, 2nd Earl of Buckingham (died 1164), English peer, son of the previous
Walter Giffard (Oxford), English medieval theologist and university administrator
Walter M. Giffard (1856–1929), Hawaiian diplomat